Jarell Martin (born May 24, 1994) is an American professional basketball player for Maccabi Tel Aviv of the Israeli Basketball Premier League and the EuroLeague. Martin, a power forward from Baton Rouge, Louisiana, played college basketball at LSU.

High school career

As one of the top prospects in the country, Martin was selected as a McDonald's All-American, the first for LSU head coach Johnny Jones. Martin was also the winner of the 2013 Mr. Basketball award given annually by the Louisiana Sports Writers Association to the top player in the state of Louisiana.

Considered a five-star recruit by ESPN.com, Martin was listed as the No. 3 power forward and the No. 11 player in the nation in 2013.

College career

Freshman season
Martin started 25 of LSU's 34 games and averaged 10.3 points, 4.6 rebounds and 26.2 minutes per game. He ranked ninth in the SEC among freshmen in scoring, and seventh among SEC freshmen in rebounding. He averaged 11.4 points per game in SEC action with 12 of his 18 double figure scoring games coming in SEC play. For his performance, Martin was selected to the SEC All-Freshman Team.

Sophomore season
As a sophomore, Martin led LSU with 16.9 points per game and increased his rebounding to 9.2 per game. He had a career-high 28 points against Florida on February 21. He had 15 double-doubles and helped lead the Tigers to the NCAA Tournament.

On March 25, 2015, Martin declared for the NBA draft, forgoing his final two years of college eligibility.

Professional career

Memphis Grizzlies (2015–2018)
On June 25, 2015, Martin was selected with the 25th overall pick in the 2015 NBA draft by the Memphis Grizzlies. Four days later, he revealed that a stress fracture in his foot would prevent him from playing in the Summer League. Despite the injury, he signed his rookie scale contract with the Grizzlies on July 10. Less than two months later, Martin sustained another foot injury, this time fracturing his left foot after colliding with another player during a workout. On December 18, he made his NBA debut in the Grizzlies' 97–88 loss to the Dallas Mavericks. His minutes increased post All-Star break thanks to multiple injured teammates. Having scored eight points total in his NBA career up until March 7, 2016, Martin had 15 of his career-high 16 points in the first half of the Grizzlies' 116–96 loss to the Boston Celtics on March 9. During his rookie season, he had multiple assignments to the Iowa Energy, the Grizzlies' D-League affiliate.

On October 30, 2016, Martin made his first career start, recording four points and five rebounds in 19 minutes in a 112–103 overtime win over the Washington Wizards. On November 28, 2016, he posted his first career double-double with 11 points and 12 rebounds in a 104–85 loss to the Charlotte Hornets. During the 2016–17 season, he had multiple assignments to the Iowa Energy.

Orlando Magic (2018–2019)
On July 23, 2018, Martin and cash considerations were traded to the Orlando Magic in exchange for Dakari Johnson and the draft rights to Tyler Harvey.

Rio Grande Valley Vipers (2020) 
On August 16, 2019, the Cleveland Cavaliers signed Martin to a one-year deal. On October 19, 2019 the Cavaliers released Martin.

On February 2, 2020, Martin signed with the Rio Grande Valley Vipers.

Sydney Kings (2020–2022)
On December 2, 2020, Martin signed a one-season (plus option) contract with the Sydney Kings of the Australian National Basketball League (NBL). He averaged 18 points and seven rebounds per game during the 2020–21 season.

On June 26, 2021, Martin recommitted to the Kings for the 2021–22 NBL season. He helped the Kings win the NBL championship in May 2022.

Maccabi Tel Aviv (2022–present)
On July 4, 2022, Martin signed a two-year deal with Maccabi Tel Aviv of the Israeli Premier League.

Career statistics

NBA

Regular season

|-
| style="text-align:left;"| 
| style="text-align:left;"| Memphis
| 27 || 0 || 14.1 || .466 || .000 || .726 || 3.2 || .6 || .3 || .3 || 5.7
|-
| style="text-align:left;"| 
| style="text-align:left;"| Memphis
| 42 || 3 || 13.3 || .384 || .360 || .800 || 3.9 || .2 || .4 || .2 || 3.9
|-
| style="text-align:left;"| 
| style="text-align:left;"| Memphis
| 73 || 36 || 22.8 || .446 || .347 || .767 || 4.4 || 1.0 || .5 || .7 || 7.7
|-
| style="text-align:left;"| 
| style="text-align:left;"| Orlando
| 42 || 1 || 7.8 || .413 || .351 || .818 || 1.7 || .4 || .1 || .2 || 2.7
|- class="sortbottom"
| style="text-align:center;" colspan="2"| Career
| 184 || 40 || 15.9 || .434 || .346 || .766 || 3.5 || .6 || .4 || .4 || 5.4

Playoffs

|-
| style="text-align:left;"| 2016
| style="text-align:left;"| Memphis
| 2 || 0 || 23.0 || .375 || .000 || .500 || 3.5 || .5 || 1.5 || .0 || 4.5
|-
| style="text-align:left;"| 2017
| style="text-align:left;"| Memphis
| 3 || 0 || 3.3 || .333 || .000 || .000 || 1.3 || .0 || .3 || .0 || 0.7
|- class="sortbottom"
| style="text-align:center;" colspan="2"| Career
| 5 || 0 || 11.2 || .364 || .000 || .500 || 2.2 || .2 || .8 || .0 || 2.2

College

|-
| style="text-align:left;"| 2013–14
| style="text-align:left;"| LSU
| 32 || 25 || 26.2 || .471 || .333 || .689 || 4.6 || .9 || .8 || .7 || 10.3
|-
| style="text-align:left;"| 2014–15
| style="text-align:left;"| LSU
| 33 || 32 || 35.1 || .509 || .269 || .690 || 9.2 || 1.8 || 1.2 || .7 || 16.9
|- class="sortbottom"
| style="text-align:center;" colspan="2"| Career
| 65 || 57 || 30.7 || .494 || .308 || .689 || 6.9 || 1.4 || 1.0 || .7 || 13.7

References

External links

LSU Tigers bio 

1994 births
Living people
21st-century African-American sportspeople
African-American basketball players
American expatriate basketball people in Australia
American men's basketball players
Basketball players from Baton Rouge, Louisiana
Iowa Energy players
LSU Tigers basketball players
Maccabi Tel Aviv B.C. players
Memphis Grizzlies draft picks
Memphis Grizzlies players
Orlando Magic players
Power forwards (basketball)
Rio Grande Valley Vipers players
Sydney Kings players